Aman Lodge railway station is a railway station on the –Matheran railway line of the Matheran Hill Railway. The Aman Lodge – Matheran service continues during monsoon too. As no automobiles are allowed in Matheran, the operation of this shuttle offers an alternative to walking or riding horses from the automobile parking area. The distance between Aman Lodge and Matheran is 3 km.

References

Railway stations in Raigad district
Railway lines opened in 1907
Mountain railways in India